The 1991 FIVB Women's World Cup was held from 8 to 17 November 1991 in 3 cities in Japan: Tokyo, Sendai, and Osaka. Twelve national teams played for the right to a fast lane ticket into the 1992 Summer Olympics in Barcelona, Spain.

Teams

Results

First round

Pool A

|}

Location: Tokyo

|}

Location: Gifu

|}

Pool B

|}

Location: Sendai

|}

Location: Kyoto

|}

Final round
The results and the points of the matches between the same teams that were already played during the first round are taken into account for the final round.

7th–12th places

|}

|}

Final places
Location: Osaka

|}

|}

Final standing

Awards

 Most Valuable Player
  Caren Kemner
 Best Scorer
  Caren Kemner
 Best Attacker
  Mireya Luis
 Best Blocker
  Gabriela Pérez del Solar
 Best Setter
  Ma Fang

 Best Server
  Mercedes Calderón
 Best Defender
  Chang Yoon-hee
 Best Coach
  Eugenio George Lafita
 '''Spirit of Fight
  Mireya Luis

External links
 Results

1991 Women's
Women's World Cup
V
V
Volleyball Women's World Cup
Women's volleyball in Japan